Heri Sudrajat Stadium is the name of a football stadium in the city of Depok, West Java, Indonesia. It was named after Mobile Brigade Corps soldier that Killed in action in Aceh. This is an Indonesian National Police owned stadium. The Stadium is located in the center of  Mobile Brigade Corps Headquarters. It is used as the home venue for Bogor F.C. of the Liga Indonesia. The stadium has a capacity of 5,000.

References

External links
 Stadium information 

Football venues in Depok
Football venues in Indonesia
Buildings and structures in West Java
Sport in West Java